JASS may refer to:

 JASS (scripting language), a scripting language behind Warcraft III games
 JASS (charity), the Japanese Association of Supporting Streetchildren

See also 
 Jass
 Jazz